The South Africa national under-17 football team (Amajimbos), is a youth football (soccer) team, which represents South Africa and is controlled by the South African Football Association, the governing body for football in South Africa. The team's main objectives are to qualify and play at the Africa U-17 Cup of Nations and FIFA U-17 World Cup and develop the players for the main national team Bafana Bafana.

History
The team was started in 1993, when the SAFA decided to form an under-17 team. The team's greatest achievement to date include a second-place finish at the 2015 African U-17 Championship, hosted in Niger and qualifying for the 2015 FIFA U-17 World Cup in Chile.

Current squad
The following 21 players were selected to compete in the 2015 FIFA U-17 World Cup.

Head coach:  Vela Khumalo

Competitive record

FIFA U-17 World Cup record

Africa U-17 Cup of Nations record

See also
Bafana Bafana (South Africa national football team)
Amajita (South Africa national under-20 football team)
Amaglug-glug (South Africa national under-23 football team)
Amabinneplaas (South Africa national development football team)
Africa U-17 Cup of Nations

References

External links
South Africa FA official website

African national under-17 association football teams
Soccer